The Tundama Province is a province of the Colombian Department of Boyacá. The province is formed by 9 municipalities.

Etymology 
The province is named after cacique Tundama.

Subdivision 
The Tundama Province comprises 9 municipalities:

References 

Provinces of Boyacá Department
Province